Jean-Antoine Le Clerc, also known as Louis Milfort, also spelled as Milford (February 2, 1752 - 1817/1820) was a French military officer and adventurer who led Creek Indian warriors during the American Revolutionary War as allies of the British. He emigrated to the British Colonies in North America in 1775. Beginning in 1776, he lived with the Creek Indians of the Upper Towns for about 20 years in frontier territory of present-day Alabama. He was befriended by the chief Alexander McGillivray, who used him as his war chief in battles. Later, after his return to Paris, Milfort joined the French Sacred Society of Sophisians. Commissioned a general in the army, he was forced into retirement with a pension.

Early life
He was born as Jean-Antoine Le Clerc, but used several alternatives and aliases during his life, especially Jean LeClerc Milfort, and Louis Le Clerc Milfort. He was from Thin-le-Moutier, near Mézières, France. He served in the French army from 1764-1774. According to his 1802 memoir, after having killed a servant of the king's household in a duel, Milfort emigrated to North America, arriving in Boston.

Among the Creek Indians
He went to Indian territory east of the Mississippi River (present-day Alabama), where he lived and traveled with the Creek Indians of the Upper Towns, in what was former French territory of La Louisiane. He gained Creek friendship by adopting their customs and was said to have been adopted into the tribe. Milfort lived with the Upper Creek in present-day Alabama from 1776 until 1795.

During the American Revolutionary war, Colonel Alexander McGillivray, chief of the Creek and commissioned by his British allies, directed several expeditions against the rebel colonists.  He relied on Le Clerc Milfort as his War Chief, or Tustunneggee (Tastenagy), to carry out his orders.  Milfort led Upper Creek forces in battles against colonial frontier settlements.  McGillivray remained at his base, controlling the chiefs, and compelling them to raise warriors to attack other settlements.

Marriage and family
As part of his alliance with the Creek, Milfort married Jeannet McGillivray, a sister of the chief Alexander McGillivray, of the Creek Indian Nation. They were both of Creek and Scots descent. Their nephew was the chief William "Red Eagle" Weatherford.

After returning to France, Milfort married a French woman named Marie-Anne Beya.

Return to France
Hearing of the changes after the French Revolution, Milfort went to Philadelphia to get a passport in 1795. He returned to Paris in 1799.  He joined the Sacred Order of the Sophisians, a secret society formed during the Napoleonic years, as the 41st member.  He offered his services to the government, specifically to make a Franco-Creek alliance and revive French claims in North America.

He hoped to command a French expedition for this purpose, a proposal well received by the foreign ministers Delacroix and Talleyrand-Périgord. Napoleon's decision to sell Louisiana to the United States in 1803 rendered Milfort's plan moot.  Milfort was ordered to remain in France; he was commissioned as a general and forced to retire, but given a pension. During the Russian invasion of 1814, Milfort was attacked in his house and was rescued by French grenadiers.  He died in 1817 or 1820.

His memoirs
He published Mémoires, ou coup-d'oeil rapide sur mes voyages en Louisiane, et mon séjour dans la nation Creeke (Paris: De l'Imprimerie de Giguet et Michaud, 1802). In his account, he described his travels, hoping to stimulate French interest in the lands of the Creek and Southeast Indians. In his 2007 book, the scholar Darius Alexander Spieth noted that Milfort used a ghostwriter for his memoirs. His book has been printed in English translation by Lakeside Classics.

References

External links
 Le Clerc Milfort, Sojourn, Rootsweb
 Afterthoughts
 About: The Three Sehoys, Sehoy: A Community in Daphne, Alabama - Official Website
 Index of French Generals, Genealogie (French)
 History of Mound Building
 "History of Baldwin County, Alabama", Rootsweb
 Albert James Pickett, History of Alabama, 1851, at Rootsweb
 Les Maréchaux, Généraux & Amiraux 1789-1815, Napoleon's Empire, en français

1752 births
19th-century deaths
Year of death uncertain
French people of the American Revolution
Native American history of Alabama